José César Ferreira Gil (1 November 1858 in Celorico da Beira, Portugal - 15 August 1922 in Lisbon, Portugal) was a Portuguese Army general and a military historian.

During World War I, Ferreira Gil served as the Commander of the Portuguese Forces in Northern Portuguese Mozambique, leading them in combat in the East African Campaign against the German Forces of Paul Emil von Lettow-Vorbeck.

References

1858 births
1922 deaths
People from Celorico da Beira
Portuguese generals
Portuguese military personnel of World War I